In photography, filter factor refers to the multiplicative amount of light a filter blocks.

Converting between filter factors and stops
The table below illustrates the relationship between filter factor, the amount of light that is allowed through the filter, and the number of stops this corresponds to.

Calculating exposure increase
The number of f-stops of light reduction, given a filter factor, may be calculated using the formula:
 
Most calculators do not have a  function. An equivalent calculation is:
  
or
 
An example: A green filter with a filter factor of 4
 

 

 
The green filter factor of 4 yields a 2 f-stop light reduction.

The filter factor, given the exposure change in f-stops, may be calculated using the formula:
 
An example: A deep red filter with an f-stop change of 3 stops
 
A change of 3 f-stops is equivalent to a filter factor of 8.

As a consequence of this relationship, filter factors should be multiplied together when such filters are stacked, as opposed to stop adjustments, which should be added together.

Filter factors for common filters

The table below gives approximate filter factors for a variety of common photographic filters.  It is important to note that filter factors are highly dependent on the spectral response curve of the film being used.  Thus, filter factors provided by the film manufacturer should be preferred over the ones documented below.  Furthermore, note well that these factors are for daylight color temperature (5600K); when shooting under a different color temperature of ambient light, these values will most likely be incorrect.

See also
Filter (photography)
Filter (optics)
Wratten number
Exposure (photography)
F-number

References
Notes

Further reading
 Hoya Corporation, Filters for imaging
 Cokin S.A., Cokin Creative Filter System

Optical filters